300 North LaSalle is a 60-story mixed-use building, constructed from 2006 to 2009, located on the north bank of the Chicago River on the Near North Side community area of Chicago, Illinois, United States. The building contains 1.3 million square feet (121,770 square meters) of space to include offices, retail shops, restaurants and public spaces, as well as three levels of underground parking. Due to its location on the north bank of the Chicago River, the building features a half-acre sunlit waterfront public garden with direct access to the river's edge. The structural steel was fabricated and erected by Cives Steel Co. and detailed by Maine Detailers, a division of Cives Steel Co.

Green Building
300 North LaSalle achieved Platinum certification under the U.S. Green Building Council's LEED for Existing Buildings (EB) category, the highest rating possible.  The tower previously received Gold certification under the LEED for Core & Shell (CS) Rating System.

Ownership
The building was sold from the Hines companies in 2010, to KBS REIT II, Inc. and then again to The Irvine Company in 2014.

Tenants

As of July 29, 2010, the building was 93% leased to 24 tenants. Kirkland & Ellis, Chicago's biggest law firm, is the anchor tenant and leases floors in the low-rise and mid-rise sections of the building.  Other tenants include the management consulting firms Boston Consulting Group and Roland Berger, private equity firm GTCR, investment banks Lazard, Moelis & Company and Sagent Advisors, the restructuring and consulting firm AlixPartners, and the corporate law firm Quarles & Brady LLP.

See also
List of buildings
List of skyscrapers
List of tallest buildings in Chicago
List of tallest buildings in the United States

References

External links

Emporis listing
Official 300 North LaSalle website
 300 North LaSalle Official Developers Website
 300 North LaSalle Official Architects Website

Skyscraper office buildings in Chicago
Leadership in Energy and Environmental Design platinum certified buildings
Office buildings completed in 2009
Hines Interests Limited Partnership
2009 establishments in Illinois